Favorite Trick (April 20, 1995 – June 6, 2006) was an American Thoroughbred racehorse who in 1997 became the first 2-year-old in twenty-five years to be voted United States Horse of the Year.

Bred at Wintergreen Farm in Midway, Kentucky by Max Wood and his wife, Sylvia, Favorite Trick was out of the mare Evil Elaine. His sire was the successful sprint horse Phone Trick, who retired with a record of nine wins and a second in ten career starts. A descendant of the great Nearco through both his sire and dam, Favorite Trick was selected by trainer Patrick B. Byrne at an auction in February 1997 as a purchase for Joseph LaCombe. Lacombe had previously had owned several horses in partnership with others.

Undefeated Horse of the Year
Trained by Byrne and ridden by Pat Day in all his races, at age two Favorite Trick went undefeated in eight starts. He scored victories in major races such as the Hopeful Stakes and Breeders Futurity. He then capped off his year with a win in the Breeders' Cup Juvenile after avoiding a near-collision on the first turn. He ran away from the field to win by five increasing lengths while setting a Breeders' Cup Juvenile record of 1:41.47.

Favorite Trick's performances in 1997 earned him the Eclipse Award for Outstanding 2-Year-Old Male Horse, and he became the first two-year-old since Secretariat in 1972 to be voted the Eclipse Award for Horse of the Year. Going into the 1998 racing season, many people made comparisons between the horses. Like Secretariat, Favorite Trick was the winterbook favorite for May's Kentucky Derby. However, some turf writers and other racing people noted that Favorite Trick had not clocked any remarkably fast times and that six of his wins had been at distances between five and seven furlongs, with both the Breeders Futurity and the Breeders' Cup Juvenile at 1 1/16 miles. Since he was a son of a sprint sire, some believed that it remained to be seen if Favorite Trick could compete at the longer distances of the American Classic Races.

Three-Year-Old racing season
For 1998, Favorite Trick's conditioning was taken over by Bill Mott after Patrick Byrne accepted an offer to take over the stable of prominent Canadian horseman Frank Stronach. Under Mott, Favorite Trick opened his 3-year-old season with a win in the 7-furlong Swale Stakes at Florida's Gulfstream Park but in the Arkansas Derby, his first attempt at 1⅛ miles (9 furlongs), he tired near the end and suffered his first defeat, winding up third behind winner Victory Gallop.

By the time parimutuel betting closed for the May 2, 1998, Kentucky Derby, Favorite Trick was the second choice behind the John R. Gaines colt Indian Charlie and slightly favored over the third choice, Overbrook Farm's Florida Derby winner, Cape Town. Starting from post position seven in the Derby, Favorite Trick moved up to fourth by the half-mile pole but fell back to wind up eighth in the fifteen-horse field behind the winning 8:1 outsider Real Quiet.

Not raced in the Preakness or Belmont Stakes, Favorite Trick did not go back to the track until July 19, when he won the 8.5 furlong Long Branch Breeders' Cup Stakes at Monmouth Park. He followed that victory with an August 9 win in the 9 furlong Jim Dandy Stakes at Saratoga Race Course, then after a fifth place on the same track in the Grade II King's Bishop Stakes, he was sent to Keeneland Race Course, where in October he won the important Keeneland Breeders' Cup Mile Stakes. Favorite Trick's victory led to him being made the betting favorite in November's Breeders' Cup Mile at Churchill Downs, where he finished eighth in a field of fourteen to winner Da Hoss.

Career as a sire
Following his Breeders' Cup loss, Favorite Trick was retired to stud duty at Walmac International near Lexington, Kentucky. He later stood at Cloverleaf Farms II in Ocala, Florida and finally at JEH Stallion Station near Hondo, New Mexico, where he and five other horses died in a barn fire on June 6, 2006. A modestly successful sire of both Thoroughbreds and American Quarter Horses, Favorite Trick sired 16 stakes winners.

References

External links
 Favorite Trick's pedigree and partial racing stats

1995 racehorse births
2006 racehorse deaths
Racehorses bred in Kentucky
Racehorses trained in the United States
Breeders' Cup Juvenile winners
Eclipse Award winners
American Thoroughbred Horse of the Year
Thoroughbred family 9-e